Juch'uy Llallawa (Quechua juch'uy small, llallawa the god of seed-time during the Inca period, "little Llallawa", Hispanicized spelling Juchuy Llallagua) is a  mountain in the Bolivian Andes. It is located in the Cochabamba Department,  Arani Province, Vacas Municipality. Juch'uy Llallawa lies south-east of the lake Asiru Qucha, beside the mountain Jatun Llallawa ("big Llallawa").

References 

Mountains of Cochabamba Department